Stout Army Air Field is located in Indianapolis, Indiana.  It serves as the Joint Forces Headquarters of the Indiana National Guard.

History
Stout Field is located west of Holt Road, north and south of Minnesota Street in west Indianapolis. Established in 1926, the airport was a stop along a transcontinental air route from New York City to Los Angeles.  The airport was officially named for Lt. Richard Harding Stout, a decorated veteran of World War I who had died in an airplane crash at Fort Benjamin Harrison.

Curtiss Flying Service operated an air passenger service and flying school at Stout Field.  Curtiss' manager was Captain Harvey Weir Cook.  By 1928, the city realized expansion possibilities were limited and began plans for what is now Indianapolis International Airport  to the west.  Captain Cook was among those who pushed for a larger municipal airport, which opened in 1931 as Indianapolis Municipal Airport.  Curtiss and Transcontinental Air Transport moved their passenger service and school to the new airport.

The United States Army Air Corps leased Stout Field from Indiana for $1 per year during World War II to use as a training base, and to conduct air transport operations. Elements of the 
Central (later Eastern) Technical Training Command were located there.

The Indiana State Police used the airfield following the war and purchased more land in order to build extensions to the runways. The site proved inadequate for landing the new class of military jets and much of the land was sold in 1953.

The site of the airport has now been mostly filled out by commercial and industrial development, though you can still see the unmistakable outline of an airfield from satellite pictures.

Units Hosted
122d Fighter Wing

Aircraft Hosted
C-47 Skytrain
C-53 Skytrooper
C-46 Commando
de Havilland Canada DHC-3 Otter
Bay Super V Bonanza
F-80 Shooting Star
F-101 Voodoo

See also
 Indiana World War II Army Airfields

References

1931 establishments in Indiana
History of Indianapolis
Airfields of the United States Army Air Forces in Indiana
Defunct airports in Indiana
Buildings and structures in Indianapolis